Barry Goldwater High School is a public high school located in Phoenix, Arizona, named after 1964 presidential candidate and well-known Arizona resident, US Senator Barry Goldwater. It is part of the Deer Valley Unified School District and opened in 1986. The school offers the International Baccalaureate (IB) Diploma Programme, which has sent alumni to highly competitive universities such as the University of Pennsylvania, Georgetown University, Princeton University, and University of California, Berkeley; it produced five National Merit semi-finalists in the class of 2007. The school is noted for a regional champion chess team for the year 2006–2007. It is an excelling school (top 15% of the state) and maintains an extremely high 68% AIMS pass rate and 99.7% AIMS attendance rate. The current principal is Anita Stulc, Ed.D.

The International Baccalaureate Programme 
There are currently eleven IB schools in Arizona. Barry Goldwater received its IB charter in 1999 and graduated its first IB class in 2002.

Awards 
2015 and 2011: Named an A+ School of Excellence 2015 by the Arizona Educational Foundation
 2011: Named a gold-level school in 2011 by the Beat The Odds Institute

Athletics 
Barry Goldwater is a full member of the AIA 5A Conference. The school offers sports during the fall, winter, and spring seasons.

Fall sports
Swimming
Cross country
Football
Golf
Chess
Volleyball (girls')
Badminton (girls')

Winter sports
Soccer
Basketball
Wrestling/Wrestlerettes

Spring sports
Baseball
Softball
Tennis
Track and field
Volleyball (boys')

References

External links
Barry Goldwater School website

High schools in Phoenix, Arizona
Educational institutions established in 1986
Public high schools in Arizona
International Baccalaureate schools in Arizona
Barry Goldwater
1986 establishments in Arizona